The Student Activity Complex is a soccer, track and field and football stadium and performing arts auditorium in Laredo, Texas owned by the United Independent School District. The complex is better known outside of South Texas as the home stadium for PDL 2007 champion franchise Laredo Heat until 2007 when the franchise moved to the Texas A&M International University Soccer Complex. The stadium also serves as home and away to UISD schools. It is home to the Alexander Bulldogs, LBJ Wolves, United Longhorns, and the United South Panthers. The auditorium is located next to the stadium which is used for band concerts, drama, and other related attractions.

Gallery

External links
Official Website
Texas Bob's High School Football Stadium Database - Student Activity Center

American football venues in Texas
Athletics (track and field) venues in Texas
Soccer venues in Texas
High school football venues in Texas
Sports venues in Laredo, Texas
Sports venues completed in 2004
2004 establishments in Texas